Pilger is a village in the Canadian province of Saskatchewan within the Rural Municipality of Three Lakes No. 400 and Census Division No. 15. The village offers a bar and restaurant (Pilger Tavern), the Pilger Public Library, an autobody shop, and Pilger General Store offering groceries, fuel and more.

History 
Pilger incorporated as a village on January 1, 1969.

Demographics 

Climate

Culture 
Pilger is home to the Annual Pilger Pumpkin Growing Contest. The festival is held on the last Saturday of September, and hosts over 500 attendees every year.

See also 
 List of communities in Saskatchewan
 Villages of Saskatchewan

References

External links
Canada's Local Histories search page  
Pilger Pumpkin Festival

Villages in Saskatchewan
Three Lakes No. 400, Saskatchewan
Division No. 15, Saskatchewan